The Unexpected is an album by the Norwegian/Belgian metal band Beautiful Sin.

The music could be described as a melodic metal release with some serious hard rock leanings, plus modern production values. Most of the songs on the album are quite mid-tempo, picking up crunch and heavier parts only during the apex of the piece or the occasional choruses. There are also two instrumental tracks on the album.

Mixed by Tommy Hansen at Jailhouse Studios in Denmark. Artwork by Thomas Ewerhard

"Lost" is a remake of "The Departed (Sun is Going Down)" from Helloween's "The Dark Ride"" album and "The Beautiful Sin" is an instrumental arrangement of "Hopes and Dreams" – a bonus track off Masterplan's "Aeronautics"

In Europe, the bonus track is "Le rêve originel," a French version of "This is Not the Original Dream." In Japan the bonus track is "She is Made of Rain."

Track listing
All tracks are written by Uli Kusch and arranged by Uli Kusch and Jørn Viggo Lofstad.

 Lost  – 4:52
 This is Not the Original Dream  – 3:47
 Take Me Home  – 3:36
 I'm Real  – 3:54
 The Spark of Ignition  – 4:36
 Closer to my Heart  – 3:44
 Give up Once for All  – 4:24
 Brace for Impact  – 3:37
 Pechvogel (Unlucky Fellow)  – 3:40
 Metalwaves  – 5:29
 The Beautiful Sin  – 4:36
 Le Reve Originel (Limited_Bonustrack) – 5:59

Personnel
Magali Luyten – vocals
Jørn Viggo Lofstad – guitars
Steinar Krokmo – bass
Axel Mackenrott – keyboards
Uli Kusch – drums

External links
 AFM Records – Bands – Beautiful Sin

2006 albums
AFM Records albums